Ä (lower case ä) is a character that represents either a letter from several extended Latin alphabets, or the letter A with an umlaut mark or diaeresis.

Usage

Independent letter 
The letter Ä occurs as an independent letter in the Finnish, Swedish, Skolt Sami, Karelian, Estonian, Luxembourgish, North Frisian, Saterlandic, Emiliano-Romagnolo, Rotuman, Slovak, Tatar, Kazakh, Gagauz, German, and Turkmen alphabets, where it represents a vowel sound.

In the Nordic countries, the vowel sound  was originally written as "Æ" when Christianisation caused the former Vikings to start using the Latin alphabet around A.D. 1100. The letter Ä arose in German and later in Swedish from originally writing the E in AE on top of the A, which with time became simplified as two dots. In the Icelandic, Faroese, Danish and Norwegian alphabets, "Æ" is still used instead of Ä.

Finnish adopted the Swedish alphabet during the 700 years that Finland was part of Sweden. Although the phenomenon of Germanic umlaut does not exist in Finnish, the phoneme  does. Estonian gained the letter through high and extensive exposure to German, with Low German throughout centuries of effective Baltic German rule, and to Swedish, during the 160 years of Estonia as a part of the Swedish Empire until 1721.

The letter is also used in some Romani alphabets.

Emilian-Romagnol
In Emilian-Romagnol ä is used to represent , occurring in some Emilian dialects, e.g. Bolognese   "well" and   "people".

Kazakh 

Under Kassym-Jomart Tokayev's suggestions to modify the Kazakh Latin alphabet, it will represent the IPA //, and the Cyrillic Ә is to be replaced by this letter, the replacement letter was Á in the 2018 proposal.

Cyrillic

Ӓ is used in some alphabets invented in the 19th century which are based on the Cyrillic script. These include Mari, Altay and the Keräşen Tatar alphabet.

Umlaut-A 

A similar glyph, A with umlaut, appears in the German alphabet. The digraph  is used for the fronting diphthong  (otherwise spelled with ) when it acts as the umlauted form of the backing diphthong  (spelled ); compare Baum  'tree' with Bäume  'trees'. In German dictionaries, the letter is collated together with A, while in German phonebooks the letter is collated as AE. The letter also occurs in some languages which have adopted German names or spellings, but is not a part of these languages' alphabets. It has recently been introduced in revivalist Ulster-Scots writing.

The letter was originally an A with a lowercase e on top, which was later stylized to two dots.

In other languages that do not have the letter as part of the regular alphabet or in limited character sets such as US-ASCII, Ä is frequently replaced with the two-letter combination "Ae".

Phonetic alphabets 
In the International Phonetic Alphabet, ä represents an open central unrounded vowel (in distinction to an open front unrounded vowel).
in the Rheinische Dokumenta, a phonetic alphabet for many West Central German, Low Rhenish, and a few related languages, "ä" represents the sound .

Typography 

Historically A-diaeresis was written as an A with two dots above the letter. A-umlaut was written as an A with a small e written above (Aͤ aͤ): this minute e degenerated to two vertical bars in medieval handwriting
(A̎ a̎). In most later handwritings these bars in turn nearly became dots.

Æ, a highly similar ligature evolving from the same origin as Ä, evolved in the Icelandic, Danish and Norwegian alphabets. The Æ ligature was also common in Old English, but had largely disappeared in Middle English.

In modern typography there was insufficient space on typewriters and later computer keyboards to allow for both A-diaeresis (also representing Ä) and A-umlaut. Since they looked near-identical the two glyphs were combined, which was also done in computer character encodings such as ISO 8859-1. As a result, there was no way to differentiate between the different characters. Unicode theoretically provides a solution, but recommends it only for highly specialized applications.

Turkmen started to use Ä officially instead of the schwa from 1993 onwards.

Computer encoding

References

External links 

 The IstroRomanians in Croatia: Alphabet

Latin letters with diacritics
Vowel letters